Henry Damián Giménez Báez (born 13 March 1986) is an Uruguayan international footballer who plays professionally for Villa Teresa, as a winger.

Club career
Born in Durazno, Giménez began his career in Uruguay playing for Centro Atlético Fénix and later in Tacuarembó F.C.

In early 2007, he was transferred River Plate de Montevideo, team were his outstanding performances help them reach the semifinals of the 2009 Copa Sudamericana.

On 2 September 2009, he signed a new deal with Italian side Bologna F.C. 1909. He made his Serie A debut on 8 November 2009 playing 12 minutes against U.S. Città di Palermo.

International career
Giménez has earned two caps for Uruguay in 2008. One against Turkey and another against Norway.

References

External links
 

1986 births
Living people
People from Durazno Department
Uruguayan footballers
Uruguayan expatriate footballers
Expatriate footballers in Italy
Uruguayan expatriate sportspeople in Italy
Expatriate footballers in Peru
Uruguayan expatriate sportspeople in Peru
Expatriate footballers in Ecuador
Uruguayan expatriate sportspeople in Ecuador
Uruguayan Primera División players
Serie A players
Serie B players
Peruvian Primera División players
Ecuadorian Serie A players
Uruguayan Segunda División players
Centro Atlético Fénix players
Tacuarembó F.C. players
Club Atlético River Plate (Montevideo) players
Bologna F.C. 1909 players
F.C. Grosseto S.S.D. players
Club Nacional de Football players
Club Universitario de Deportes footballers
Mushuc Runa S.C. footballers
Gżira United F.C. players
Deportivo Maldonado players
Villa Teresa players
Association football forwards
Uruguay international footballers